Cantharidus antipoda puysegurensis is a subspecies of marine gastropod mollusc in the family Trochidae, the top shells.

Distribution
This species is found at the South Island, New Zealand.

References

 Powell A. W. B., William Collins Publishers Ltd, Auckland 1979

External links
 

puysegurensis
Gastropods of New Zealand